Terne is a Norwegian anti-submarine weapon system, which uses rocket-thrown depth charges. It was developed by the Norwegian Defence Research Establishment (FFI) in cooperation with the U.S. Navy in the late 1940s-early 1960s. The Terne development project consisted of three phases:

Terne I  : Development of a rocketborn depth charge.

Terne II: Development and construction of a landbased ASW for naval defense.

Terne III: Development and construction of a shipborne ASW.

A Terne III weapon system consists of a search & track sonar, a fire-control system and the rocket launchers, which can store six salvos of six rockets each. The rocket itself, is a depth charge with multiple fusing modes (preset time after water entry, proximity, or contact), which is propelled through the air by a solid-fueled rocket motor.

User countries
  (Phased out)
  (Phased out)
  (Phased out)

See also
Anti-submarine warfare

References

Weapons of Norway
Cold War anti-submarine weapons of the United States
Cold War weapons of Germany
Naval weapons of Germany